Envipco ("Environmental Products Corporation") is an American manufacturer and distributor of reverse vending machines.  Envipco's corporate headquarters are located in Naugatuck, Connecticut.

Products

Reverse vending machines
Envipco products include Reverse vending machines and customized solutions for its clients. Reverse vending machines (RVMs) collect, compact and sort customers' empty beverage containers and, where applicable, issue a voucher redeemable for cash. The Envipco RVMs can also have interactive advertising, couponing, and integration with Retailer POS.
Envipco's reverse vending machines differ based on the market in which they appear.  In deposit-and-return markets, the reverse vending machines use bar code and/or camera technology to identify the product being recycled.  In non-deposit markets the reverse vending machines identify the product as being PET or aluminum.In the United States, Envipco machines are most common in the 10 states that require bottle deposits. Envipco's products can be found around the globe in both deposit and non-deposit markets - including USA, Canada, the UK, France, Sweden, Greece, Cyprus, Australia and Japan. 
Envipco's current flagship product is the Quantum bulk-feed reverse vending machine.
In states that do not have bottle deposits, as well as outside of the United States, reverse vending machines can generate coupons, prizes or vouchers for donations to schools.

Recycling centers
"Envipco's" products are also featured in Recycling Centers.  The Quantum Outdoor RVM allows storage of approximately 60,000 containers before it needs to be emptied.  "Envipco's" Ultra 48 and Ultra HDS are also featured in outdoor kiosks - especially prolific in the Greek (non-deposit) and Australian (deposit) markets.

References 

Recycling
Recycling in the United States
Waste management companies of the United States
Multinational companies headquartered in the United States
Companies based in New Haven County, Connecticut
Naugatuck, Connecticut
American companies established in 1979
1979 establishments in Connecticut
Waste management companies of France